Hsu Wen-chi (born 28 September 1997) is a Taiwanese badminton player. She started playing badminton at age 9, and debuted at the 2013 Maldives International. She joined the Chinese Taipei national badminton team in 2014. She is the two-time national championships winner, and the National Games gold medalist.

Achievements

BWF International Challenge/Series (9 titles, 2 runners-up)
Women's singles

  BWF International Challenge tournament
  BWF International Series tournament
  BWF Future Series tournament

References

External links 
 

1997 births
Living people
Sportspeople from Taipei
Taiwanese female badminton players
21st-century Taiwanese women